Karlo Žiger (born 11 May 2001) is a Croatian professional footballer who plays as a goalkeeper for Gorica.

Career
Žiger started his career with English Premier League side Chelsea. Before the second half of 2018–19, he was sent on loan to Sutton United in the English fifth tier. In 2021, Žiger was sent on loan to Slovenian second tier club Rudar Velenje. In 2022, he signed for Gorica in the Croatian top flight.

References

External links
 

2001 births
Living people
Footballers from Zagreb
Association football goalkeepers
Croatian footballers
Croatia youth international footballers
Chelsea F.C. players
HNK Gorica players
NK Rudar Velenje players
Sutton United F.C. players
Slovenian Second League players
Croatian expatriate footballers
Expatriate footballers in England
Croatian expatriate sportspeople in England
Croatian expatriate sportspeople in Slovenia
Expatriate footballers in Slovenia